The Raven class was a class of two World War II-era U.S. Navy minesweepers.

Ships

External links
Minesweeper (AM)- Minesweeper, Steel hulled (MSF)- Minesweeper, Ocean (MSO) - British Minesweepers (BAM) - Index

References

Mine warfare vessel classes